Abyzov (masculine) or Abyzova (feminine) is a Russian surname. Variants of this surname include Abysov/Abysova (/), Obyzov/Obyzova (/), and Obysov/Obysova (/).

It derives from a patronymic which itself is derived from the nickname "" (Obyz) or its phonetic variations "" (Abyz), "" (Abys), and "" (Obys). In the 15th–17th centuries, the primary meaning of the word "" or "" was a Muslim cleric, a mullah, but it is more likely that the nicknames were derived from the figurative meanings of the word in some dialects: an impious person, a wrong-doer, a miscreant, an insolent person, one who disobeys.

The surname is shared by the following people:
Dmitry Abyzov (born 1992), Russian association football player
Mikhail Abyzov (born 1972), Russian politician

See also
Abyzovo, several rural localities in Russia

References

Notes

Sources
И. М. Ганжина (I. M. Ganzhina). "Словарь современных русских фамилий" (Dictionary of Modern Russian Last Names). Москва, 2001. 

Russian-language surnames
